Joaquín Prat Carreras (27 April 1927 – 3 June 1995) was one of the best-known Spanish radio and television presenters.

Biography
Joaquín Prat was born in Xàtiva on 27 April 1927. He earned a licentiate in Law, and before becoming famous, worked as an administrative officer. In 1959 he joined Radio Nacional de España. He went on to work on more than 20 radio programs. He appeared on Cadena SER until 1987, with iconic shows such as Mañanas de Radio Madrid, Radio Madrid madrugada, and Carrusel Deportivo.

From 1988 to 1993 he presented  (the Spanish edition of The Price Is Right), a game show on which he made famous the exclamation ¡A jugar! (Let's play!), accompanied by a distinctive arm movement.

Other programs he presented were: 

  (1971), musical program
  (1971), with 
  (1974), with José Luis Pécker
  (1978), game show about the FIFA World Cup
  (1980–1981), with Mónica Randall and 
  (1993–1994), with Miriam Díaz-Aroca
  (1994)

He received two Premios Ondas: in 1970 (National Television) as Best Presenter, and in 1989 (National Radio) for Vivir es formidable. He also received the TP de Oro three times: as Best Presenter in 1980 for Cosas, in 1988 for El precio justo, and a professional career award in 1991.

He was married to Irishwoman Anne McKiernan from 1973 to 1984, and to Marianne Sandberg from Denmark from 1984 to 1995.

His children , Alejandra, and Andrea Prat Sandberg have also dedicated themselves to the world of television.

Joaquín Prat died in Madrid on 3 June 1995 after suffering a myocardial infarction and spending two months in a coma.

References

External links
 

1927 births
1995 deaths
Eurovision Song Contest conductors
People from Xàtiva
Spanish game show hosts
Spanish radio personalities